U-33 (S183) is the third Type 212A submarine of the German Navy.

It was laid down 30 April 2001 by HDW in Kiel, launched in September 2004 and commissioned on 13 June 2006.

Service history 
U-33 is currently part of the 1st Ubootgeschwader, based in Eckernförde. The submarine's first mission was participation in Operation Active Endeavour in 2007.

References 

Type 212 submarines of the German Navy
Attack submarines
2004 ships
Submarines of Germany